Gränum is a locality situated in Olofström Municipality, Blekinge County, Sweden with 223 inhabitants in 2010.

Natives from Gränum
 Robert Engstrand - (born 6 July 1976), pianist and keyboard player

References 

Populated places in Olofström Municipality